Kimmo Rauhamäki (born 31 March 1951 in Längelmäki) is a Finnish orienteering competitor. He received a bronze medal in the relay event at the 1976 World Orienteering Championships in Aviemore, together with Hannu Mäkirinta, Markku Salminen and Matti Mäkinen.

See also
 Finnish orienteers
 List of orienteers
 List of orienteering events

References

1951 births
Living people
Finnish orienteers
Male orienteers
Foot orienteers
World Orienteering Championships medalists